Folashade Pratt (born April 2, 1993) is an American soccer player who plays for Braga of the Campeonato Nacional de Futebol Feminino.

Early life and collegiate career
Pratt attended the Rosemount High School at her hometown. In her time there she earned several accolades, including  being nominated two-times All-Metro selection, two-times all-state and three-times all-conference selection. In 2011, Pratt went to University of Maryland. She played only seven matches in her freshman year. In her sophomore year, she became a starter for the Terrapins, playing most as a wide midfield and a wide back. In her junior year, Pratt played for the first time in her career as a centre-back. In her senior year, after several Terrapins were sidelined by injuries, Pratt was moved to frontline, becoming a forward.

Club career
Pratt was the 25th overall pick in the 2015 NWSL College Draft when she was picked by Sky Blue FC. Pratt only played one match for the SBFC, on June 28, 2015, against Chicago Red Stars. For the 2016 National Women's Soccer League season, Pratt signed with Portland Thorns FC. She played five matches for the Thorns in that season.

In 2017 she was signed to the Norwegian top club Røa Dynamite Girls. From August she was on loan to another club in the same division, Stabaek Chixa. She signed with the Swedish club IFK Kalmar in January 2018.

In June 2019, she signed with the Portuguese champions, Braga.

References

External links
 IFK Kalmar player profile
 University of Maryland player profile
 
 Player's Profile at Fox Sports

NJ/NY Gotham FC players
NJ/NY Gotham FC draft picks
Portland Thorns FC players
University of Maryland, College Park alumni
American women's soccer players
People from Rosemount, Minnesota
Living people
Maryland Terrapins women's soccer players
Soccer players from Minnesota
National Women's Soccer League players
1993 births
IFK Kalmar players
Women's association football defenders
Women's association football forwards
S.C. Braga (women's football) players
Expatriate women's footballers in Portugal